Harry Hunter MacLaughlin (August 9, 1927 – May 3, 2005) was a United States district judge of the United States District Court for the District of Minnesota.

Education and career

Born in Breckenridge, Minnesota, MacLaughlin was in the United States Navy as a yeoman from 1945 to 1946. He received a Bachelor of Business Administration from the University of Minnesota in 1949 and a Bachelor of Laws from the University of Minnesota Law School in 1956. He was in private practice in Minneapolis, Minnesota from 1956 to 1972. He was an adjunct professor at William Mitchell College of Law from 1958 to 1963. He was an associate justice of the Minnesota Supreme Court from 1972 to 1977. He was a lecturer at the University of Minnesota Law School from 1973 to 1986.

Federal judicial service

MacLaughlin was nominated by President Jimmy Carter on August 4, 1977, to a seat on the United States District Court for the District of Minnesota vacated by Judge Earl R. Larson. He was confirmed by the United States Senate on September 16, 1977, and received his commission on September 19, 1977. He served as Chief Judge in 1992. He assumed senior status on October 1, 1992. MacLaughlin served in that capacity until his death on May 3, 2005, in Edina, Minnesota.

References

Sources
 

1927 births
2005 deaths
Minnesota state court judges
Judges of the United States District Court for the District of Minnesota
United States district court judges appointed by Jimmy Carter
20th-century American judges
Carlson School of Management alumni
University of Minnesota Law School alumni
United States Navy sailors
Justices of the Minnesota Supreme Court